Remo Ruffini (born August 1961) is an Italian billionaire businessman, the chairman and CEO of the fashion company Moncler. He controls Ruffini Partecipazioni Srl that owns 19.3% of Moncler.

Early life
Remo Ruffini is the son of Gianfranco Ruffini who, in the 1970s, was owner of a clothing company in New York City called Gianfranco Ruffini Ltd. His mother, Enrica, owned a clothing company as well.

Career
Ruffini started his career in the US, working for his father's eponymous clothing company, Gianfranco Ruffini Ltd.

At 23, he returned to Italy and founded a company, New England, which he sold sixteen years later (in 2000) to Stefanel Group. That same year, he started working as a creative consultant for the holding company which owned Moncler.

In 2003, Ruffini took over Moncler, which was almost bankrupt at the time, and transformed the company by reinventing the brand.

Ten years later, in December 2013, Ruffini took the company public by listing it on Milan's stock exchange. Within the first afternoon, the share price rose 47%.

In 2018, Ruffini conceived the Moncler Genius project, where well-known designers create collections interpreting Moncler’s identity that are released on a monthly basis.

Personal life 
Ruffini is married, with two children, and lives in Como, Italy.

Ruffini is the owner of a Bombardier Global 5500 with registration I-DBRR. The aircraft was built in 2020. She replaces a Bombardier Challenger 650, with registration I-DBLR.

He owns a 180-ft yacht called "Atlante" and launched in 2015.

Awards
Entrepreneur of the Year 2017 for Italy.

Honours
 Knight of Labour (Cavaliere del lavoro) - Order of Merit for Labour

References

1961 births
Living people
Italian billionaires
Italian businesspeople
People from Como